Kristal Abazaj (born 6 July 1996) is an Albanian professional footballer who plays as a right winger for Kategoria Superiore club Tirana and the Albania national team.

Club career

Luftëtari Gjirokastër
In July 2016, Abazaj went on trial with top flight side Luftëtari Gjirokastër, a trail which he successfully passed, and in August 2016 signed the contract. He made his competitive debut as well as his first Albanian Superliga appearance in the opening matchday of 2016–17 season against Partizani Tirana which finished in a 0–1 loss. He finished his first season with Luftëtari by making 35 appearances, including 33 in league, 30 of them as starter, collecting 2507 minutes and scoring 3 goals as Lufëtari finished 4th in the championship. Abazaj was distinguished for his performances throughout the season and at the end of the campaign he was named one of the talents of the season.

During the summer transfer window, Lufëtari declined several offers for Abazaj from in and outside the country. He started the second season on strong form, netting his team's only goal in the 2–1 defeat to Teuta Durrës in the opening week of championship. This was followed by another one which turned out to be the winner as Lufëtari defeated Laçi for the first three points of the season.

On 17 December, Abazaj scored in the matchday 15 versus Partizani Tirana after collecting the ball on the right side near the halfway line, running 70 metres (229 ft), nutmegging Labinot Ibrahimi before beating Alban Hoxha with a right-footed shoot in an eventual 5–0 home win. He was named Albanian Superliga Player of the Month for December after bagging three goals in four matches, helping the team in their bid to escape relegation.

At the end of the 2017–18, Abazaj was named Albanian Superliga Talent of the Season, becoming the second ever Luftëtari player to win it.

Skënderbeu Korçë
On 5 January 2018, Skënderbeu Korçë announced to have signed a pre-contract with Abazaj for €300,000. The player continued to represent Luftëtari as loanee until the end of the season.

Anderlecht
On 16 April 2018, it was announced that Abazaj has signed a three-year contract with Belgian side Anderlecht. The transfer fee reportedly was €750,000 and the player will join the club on 1 July 2018.

International career

Youth
After a good run of form with Luftëtari, on 17 March 2017 Abazaj was named by manager Alban Bushi in the Albania under-21 squad to face Moldova in a double friendly match. He made his first appearance on 25 March by playing 66 minutes as the first match finished in a goalless draw. Abazaj scored his first goal two days later to lead Albania into a 2–0 win.

Abazaj continued to be part of the under-21 squad as he was called up in June for the friendly against France and the opening qualifying match of 2019 UEFA European Under-21 Championship against Estonia. He made his competitive debut on 12 June against Estonia playing 86 minutes in the goalless draw. Abazaj scored his first goals of the campaign in the matchday 3 against Iceland on 4 September 2017 where he scored twice to help Albania take an away 2–3 win, the first in Group 2.

Senior
Abazaj received his first Albania senior call-up by manager Christian Panucci on 16 March 2018 for the friendly match against Norway and he became the first Luftëtari player in 30 years to be called-up at senior side. On 29 May 2018, Abazaj made his debut with Albania in friendly match against Kosovo after coming on as a substitute at 69th minute in place of Emanuele Ndoj.

Personal life
Abazaj has cited his role model and favourite footballer the Brazilian striker Ronaldo. In an interview in December 2018, Abazaj unveiled that he is a longtime fan of KF Tirana, adding that he used to go with his family to watch their games in stadium when he was young.

Career statistics

Club

International

Honours
Individual
Albanian Superliga Player of the Month: December 2017
Albanian Superliga Talent of the Season: 2017–18

References

External links

Kristal Abazaj at the Albanian Football Association

1996 births
Living people
Footballers from Elbasan
Albanian footballers
Association football forwards
Association football midfielders
Albanian men's footballers
Albania youth international footballers
Albania under-21 international footballers
Albania international footballers
KF Elbasani players
Luftëtari Gjirokastër players
R.S.C. Anderlecht players
NK Osijek players
FK Kukësi players
İstanbulspor footballers
Albanian expatriate footballers
Expatriate footballers in Belgium
Albanian expatriate sportspeople in Belgium
Expatriate footballers in Croatia
Albanian expatriate sportspeople in Croatia
Expatriate footballers in Turkey
Albanian expatriate sportspeople in Turkey
Kategoria e Parë players
Kategoria Superiore players
Belgian Pro League players
Croatian Football League players
TFF First League players
Süper Lig players